Jayden Antwi-Nyame (born 1998) is an English footballer who plays as a forward.

Playing career
Antwi joined AFC Wimbledon's youth team in 2011, and signed his first professional contract with the club on 28 March 2017. He made his senior debut four days later, coming on for Tom Elliott 72 minutes into a 2–0 defeat to Port Vale at Vale Park.

He was released by AFC Wimbledon at the end of the 2017–18 season.

Statistics

References

External links

Living people
English footballers
Association football forwards
AFC Wimbledon players
English Football League players
Black British sportsmen
1998 births